Aleksander Kłopotowski (born 10 December 1895, date of death unknown) was a Polish painter. His work was part of the painting event in the art competition at the 1928 Summer Olympics.

References

1895 births
Year of death missing
20th-century Polish painters
20th-century Polish male artists
Artists from Warsaw
Olympic competitors in art competitions
Polish male painters